Annise Danette Parker (born May 17, 1956) is an American politician who served as the 61st Mayor of Houston, Texas, from 2010 until 2016. She also served as an at-large member of the Houston City Council from 1998 to 2003 and city controller from 2004 to 2010.

Parker was Houston's second female mayor (after Kathy Whitmire), and one of the first openly gay mayors of a major U.S. city, with Houston being the most populous U.S. city to elect an openly gay mayor until Lori Lightfoot was elected mayor of Chicago in 2019.

Following the voter-approval of Proposition 2 on November 3, 2015, which extended the terms of the Mayor, City Controller, and City Councilmembers to two four-year terms, Parker became the last Houston Mayor to be limited to serving three two-year terms.

Early life and education 
Parker was born in Houston on May 17, 1956, and grew up in the community of Spring Branch, where she attended public schools. Her mother was a bookkeeper, and her adoptive father worked for the Red Cross. She lived briefly in Mississippi and South Carolina. In 1971, when Parker was 15, her family moved to a U.S. Army post in Mannheim, Germany for two years. In Germany, she volunteered in the Red Cross youth service organization and worked at the post library.

Growing up, Parker was extremely shy and suffered from extreme anxiety. Her family even nicknamed her "turtle", and she maintains a turtle collection today.

Parker began attending Rice University on a National Merit scholarship in 1974, working several jobs to pay for her room and board. While at Rice, Parker founded a lesbian student group. A member of Jones College, she graduated in 1978 with a bachelor's degree in anthropology, psychology and sociology. In 2005, Parker completed Harvard University's John F. Kennedy School of Government program for Senior Executives in State and Local Government as a David Bohnett LGBTQ Victory Institute Leadership Fellow.

Career
Prior to serving as an elected official, Parker worked in the oil and gas industry as a software analyst for over 20 years, including 18 years at Mosbacher Energy. In addition, she co-owned Inklings Bookshop with business partner Pokey Anderson from the late 1980s until 1997 and served as president of the Neartown Civic Association from 1995 to 1997. In 1986 and 1987, she was president of the Houston GLBT Political Caucus.

City Council
Parker ran unsuccessfully for City Council District C in 1991 and again in 1995, finishing third in the special election for At-Large position 4, the seat vacated by Sheila Jackson Lee after her election to Congress.

In 1997, Parker prevailed in the runoff election for At-Large position 1 to become Houston's first openly gay elected official. She was re-elected twice to the same seat in 1999 and 2001 without being forced to a run-off. As a councilmember, she was recognized as "Councilmember of the Year" by the Houston Police Officers Union and earned the "Distinguished Local Elected Official Award" from the Texas Recreational and Park Society.

City Controller
In 2003, Parker was elected City Controller.  She was re-elected in 2005 and 2007 unopposed. In addition, Parker also secured a seat for a controller's appointee on the Houston Municipal Pension System Board of Trustees, marking the first time the city's chief financial officer has had any involvement in the pension system."

Houston mayor

2009 election

In 2009, Parker announced her candidacy for the office of Mayor of Houston in a video posted online to her campaign website. She was endorsed by several organizations and campaigned on a platform of better city security and financial efficiency. Other people who were in the running for mayor included Houston City Council Member Peter Hoyt Brown and Harris County school board trustee Roy Morales; they were eliminated from the race on November 3, 2009. She entered the run-off election with the most votes to face former Houston City Attorney Gene Locke who garnered the second most votes.  In the general election, the city's primary newspaper endorsed both Parker and Locke.

During the run-off election, Parker was endorsed by former rival Peter Hoyt Brown.  The city's primary newspaper, the Houston Chronicle, endorsed Parker over Locke citing her experience.  Parker was elected mayor on December 12, 2009, and assumed office on January 2, 2010.  Houston became the largest U.S. city ever to have an openly gay individual serve as mayor.  After the election, Parker declared that the top priorities of her administration would be improving transportation, balancing the city's budget, and selecting a new police chief.

2011 election

In the 2011 election, Parker won a second term as Houston's Mayor by defeating Fernando Herrera, Jack O'Connor, Dave Wilson, Kevin Simms, and Amanda Ulman without a runoff.

2013 election

In November 2013, Parker won a third term as Houston's Mayor by winning 57.22% of the vote, making a runoff unnecessary.

Parker was succeeded on January 2, 2016, by state legislator Sylvester Turner, who became the city's second African American mayor.

Houston Equal Rights Ordinance

On May 28, 2014, the Houston City Council passed the Houston Equal Rights Ordinance (HERO) which was authored by Parker, by a vote of 11 to 6. Mayor Parker had certified that "there exists a public emergency requiring that this Ordinance be passed finally on the date of its introduction". On July 3, 2014, opponents of the ordinance submitted 50,000 signatures to the city to force the ordinance to a vote of the public.  The city announced that the opponents were 2,022 signatures short of the 17,269 needed to put the matter to a vote. HERO opponents filed a lawsuit against Mayor Parker and the city on August 5, 2014. In response, city attorneys defending the law filed subpoenas for sermons from local Christian pastors.  Attorneys for the pastors called the subpoenas retaliation against Christians for opposing the ordinance. Parker maintained that the attorneys who dealt with the lawsuit for the city were outside lawyers (i.e., not city employees) and that she and City Attorney David Feldman had been unaware of the subpoenas. After what some news organizations called a "firestorm" of criticism over the subpoenas (Parker said that she had been "vilified coast to coast"), Parker directed the city's attorneys on October 29, 2014, to withdraw the subpoenas. After the subpoenas were withdrawn, local city pastors filed a civil rights lawsuit against Parker. The ordinance was later overturned by Houston voters by a 61%-39% margin.

Recent career
After leaving the office of Mayor in 2016, she's been working for nonprofit organizations in Houston, including her role as Senior Vice President and Chief Strategy Officer for community development nonprofit BakerRipley. Since December 2017 Parker serves as CEO and President of the Gay and Lesbian Victory Fund and Leadership Institute. She is also a professor at the Doerr Institute for New Leaders at Rice University.

Parker currently serves on the board of directors of the Holocaust Museum Houston and Girls Inc. and the advisory boards of the Houston Zoo, the Montrose Counseling Center, Bering Omega Community Services, and Trees for Houston. She is also involved in historic preservation efforts in Houston and received the “Good Brick Award” from the Greater Houston Preservation Alliance for her restoration of historic properties in the Old Sixth Ward.

Personal life
Parker and her wife, Kathy Hubbard, have been together since 1990. On January 16, 2014, Parker and Hubbard were married in Palm Springs, California. They have two adopted children together, as well as a then-teenage boy that they offered a home and whom they consider their son, and a god-daughter.

Parker resides in East Montrose (a neighborhood of Houston) as of 2002; she had lived there since around 1991.

Awards and honors 
In June 2020, in honor of the 50th anniversary of the first LGBTQ Pride parade, Queerty named her among the fifty heroes “leading the nation toward equality, acceptance, and dignity for all people”.

Electoral history

2003

2005

2007

2009

2013

See also 

 LGBT community of Houston

References

External links 

 Annise Parker article in Ballotpedia
 Annise Parker campaign website (archived)
 CityMayors Mayor of the Month profile of Annise Parker (February 2015)
 Parker, Annise and Madeline Appel. Mayor Annise Parker Oral History , Houston Oral History Project, December 29, 2010.
 

1956 births
20th-century American politicians
20th-century American women politicians
21st-century American politicians
21st-century American women politicians
Comptrollers in the United States
Houston City Council members
Lesbian politicians
LGBT people from Texas
American LGBT rights activists
Living people
Mayors of Houston
Rice University alumni
Texas Democrats
Women mayors of places in Texas
LGBT culture in Houston
Women city councillors in Texas
21st-century LGBT people
LGBT mayors of places in the United States